Beicai is a station on Line 13 of the Shanghai Metro, part of phase two of the line.  Located along Chengshan Road west of Hunan Road in the city's Pudong New Area, the station opened along with the rest of phases 2 and 3 of the line on 30 December 2018.

References 

Railway stations in Shanghai
Shanghai Metro stations in Pudong
Railway stations in China opened in 2018
Line 13, Shanghai Metro